Babenhausen may refer to:

 Babenhausen, Hesse, city in the Darmstadt-Dieburg district, Hesse, Germany
 Babenhausen, Bavaria, municipality in the Unterallgäu district, Bavaria, Germany